Jinhua is a Chinese unisex given name. Notable people with the name include:

 Dai Jinhua (born 1959), Chinese film critic
 Li Jinhua (born 1943), Chinese politician
 Lu Jinhua (1927–2018), Chinese Yue opera artist

Chinese given names
Unisex given names